Workshare is a provider of secure enterprise file sharing and collaboration applications. Content owners are able to track and compare changes in documents from contributors simultaneously.

History 

In 1999, UK technology entrepreneur Barrie Hadfield co-founded Workshare, a provider of client-server document comparison software. Workshare's applications are used by legal and professional services organizations to track changes in contracts and documents. In 2012, Workshare merged with Skydox, also founded by Barrie Hadfield, a provider of cloud-enabled document collaboration software for the enterprise sector. Scottish Equity Partners and Business Growth Fund invested £20m in the deal.

Workshare also acquired IdeaPlane, an enterprise social network, in 2012.

Workshare was acquired by its competitor, Litera, in 2019.

See also 

 Collaborative software
 Document collaboration 
 Document Management Systems
 Cloud Storage
 Cloud collaboration
 Social business 
 Software as a Service

References 

British companies established in 1999
Companies based in the London Borough of Tower Hamlets